Hoseynabad (also Romanized as Ḩoseynābād; also known as Ḩoseynābād-e Bālā, Ḩoseynābād-e ‘Olyā, and Husainābād) is a village in Rezvan Rural District, Ferdows District, Rafsanjan County, Kerman Province, Iran. At the 2006 census, its population was 537, in 139 families.

References 

Populated places in Rafsanjan County